William or Bill Winter may refer to:

Bill Winter (American football) (born 1943), American football player
Bill Winter (linebacker) (born 1940), American football player; played for the New York Giants (1962–1964)
Bill Winter (British Army officer) (William Arthur Winter, 1913–2004), British soldier
W. Christopher Winter (born 1972), sleep medicine specialist and neurologist
William H. Winter (1819–1879), American explorer and author
William J. Winter (born 1930), Roman Catholic auxiliary bishop of Pittsburgh
William Winter (author) (1836–1917), American drama critic and author
William Winter (chess player) (1898–1955), British chess player 
William Winter (cricketer) (1843–1905), English cricketer
William F. Winter (1923-2020), American politician; former Governor of Mississippi 
William Winter-Irving (1840–1901), born William Irving Winter, Australian politician

See also
William Wynter (1519–1589), English admiral
William Winter Payne (1807–1874), U.S. Representative from Alabama